Rauvolfia sandwicensis, the devil's-pepper, also known as hao in the Hawaiian language, is a species of flowering plant in the milkweed family, Apocynaceae, that is endemic to Hawaii.

References

External links

sandwicensis
Endemic flora of Hawaii
Trees of Hawaii